Mahendra Mohan Gupta  is owner of Dainik Jagran group of Hindi newspapers published in India. The paper has readership of 20 million mainly in state of Uttar Pradesh. The paper has 25 editions. They plan to launch an English language newspaper and a stand alone tabloid.

References

External links
 Mahendra Mohan Gupta profile

Indian mass media owners
Living people
People from Kanpur
Year of birth missing (living people)